Chicago Transit Authority is the debut album by the Chicago-based rock band Chicago (then known as Chicago Transit Authority). It was recorded and released in 1969 and became a sleeper hit, reaching number 17 on the Billboard 200 by 1971 and spawning several successful singles, including "Does Anybody Really Know What Time It Is?", "Questions 67 and 68" and "Beginnings". The album stayed on the Billboard chart for 171 weeks,<ref name= beating the previous record for a rock album's longevity of 155 weeks and has been certified double platinum by the Recording Industry Association of America (RIAA). For this inaugural recording effort the group was nominated for a Grammy Award for 1969 Best New Artist of the Year. The album was inducted into the Grammy Hall of Fame in 2014.

History
Chicago was formed in early 1967, first as the Big Thing, then Chicago Transit Authority when producer James William Guercio took them on in 1968. Their trademark was fusing brass and jazz with a soulful rock and roll feel that Guercio thought would prove successful, lobbying for his label to sign the band.

Chicago Transit Authority signed to Columbia Records late in 1968 and recorded their first album in late January 1969 at CBS studios on 52nd Street in New York City. While Guercio had recently produced Blood, Sweat & Tears' second album (which proved to be a huge smash), he did so to raise capital for his band, and to secure the contract with Columbia (which was reluctant at first to have two jazz-rock bands since Blood, Sweat & Tears was already on their roster). By the end of the Chicago Transit Authority sessions, the band had decided they wanted it to be a double album. Skeptical, as the band had no track record, Columbia agreed to the concept only if the group would take a royalty cut.

In addition to the material recorded for the album, "Wake Up Sunshine", "It Better End Soon" (both later released on their second album), "Loneliness is Just a Word" (later released on Chicago III), and an early version of "Mississippi Delta City Blues" (with mostly different music than its eventual versions on Live in Japan and Chicago XI) all date from this era, and were performed as early as 1968. Other early original songs, such as "Dedicated to Girl Number 1" and "Once Upon a Life", were never released.

Released in April 1969, Chicago Transit Authority (sometimes informally referred to simply as "CTA") was not an immediate hit, eventually reaching No. 17 in the US and No. 9 in the UK. While critical reaction was generally favorable, sales were slow at first and the album initially failed to produce any hit singles, with the group seen as an album-oriented collective. Meanwhile, FM radio, with its album-oriented format, helped push sales along. In 1970 and 1971, "Does Anybody Really Know What Time It Is?" (No. 7), "Beginnings" (No. 7) and "Questions 67 and 68" (No. 71 and No. 24 for the 1971 re-release) all made it into the Billboard Hot 100 belatedly. Buoyed by the success of their later albums, Chicago Transit Authority had stayed on the charts for 171 weeks as of June 1975, setting the then record for a rock album's chart longevity by October 1974 at 155 weeks, and was certified gold (and later platinum and double platinum) by the Recording Industry Association of America (RIAA).

While the band toured the album, legal action was threatened by the actual Chicago Transit Authority, forcing the group to truncate their name to simply Chicago.

Musical style, writing, composition
Keyboardist Robert Lamm, guitarist Terry Kath and bassist Peter Cetera shared lead vocals, while James Pankow, Lee Loughnane and Walter Parazaider handled all brass and woodwinds (trombone, trumpet and saxophone, clarinet and flute respectively) and Danny Seraphine played drums. (Parazaider is pictured in the album package playing flute, but doesn't actually play it on the album.) Band members added percussion during sections of a song when they weren't playing their main instrument. For example, on "I'm a Man", Pankow was on cowbell, Parazaider on tambourine, and Loughnane on claves. Lamm, Kath and Pankow were the band's main composers at this time. According to the band's producer, James William Guercio, Jimi Hendrix was an avowed fan of Kath's playing. According to the album's original liner notes, the solo performance of Kath on "Free Form Guitar" was created without the use of any pedals. In a nod to Hendrix's guitar expressionism (Hendrix most notably used wah and fuzz pedals), Kath instead plugged directly into his studio amplifier and improvised the entire track in one take for the purpose of pure tone. "Free Form Guitar" was an influence on the genre of noise music.

The album is one of two not to have any songwriting contributions from Cetera during his tenure in the band, the other being Chicago V. He started writing songs with the second album, Chicago.

Recording and production 
Because of dealings between the recording company and the group's producer, James William Guercio, the group's studio time was limited to only five days of basic tracking and five days of overdubbing by the recording company. According to Guercio, the album was "done 8-track."

According to band member Walt Parazaider, when the group went into the studio to record the album, they " 'found out we knew very little about what we were doing. ... The first song was “Does Anybody Really Know What Time It Is?” We tried to record it as a band, live, all of us in the studio at once.' " Finally it was decided that drums, bass, keyboard, and guitars would be recorded first, and then the horns and vocals.

Artwork 
The cover design for the album is called "Painted Shingle" on the group's official web site. The inside jacket features individual photos of each band member, which reviewer Peter Morelli notes, "For a band deliberately constructed to be a leaderless democracy, Robert Lamm (far right, standing) sure stands out in the band photos!"

Reissues 

In 1974, the album was also mixed in quadraphonic sound and released on SQ encoded LP (GQ-33255) and Dolby Quadraphonic 8-Track (QCA-33255).

In 2002, Chicago Transit Authority was remastered and reissued on one CD by Rhino Records and Columbia Records. Rhino Records trimmed some of the songs, noticeably the fadeouts on "Questions #67 and #68" (six seconds longer on the LP) and "Free Form Guitar" (five seconds longer), the 10 second gap between "Someday" and "Liberation", and some studio chatter.

In 2010, Rhino Handmade re-released the original quadraphonic mix of the album on a limited edition DTS DVD, and in 2016, in DTS-HD Master Audio, as part of Chicago Quadio Box Set.

On June 26, 2019, Rhino Records announced a 50th Anniversary Remix edition of Chicago Transit Authority, offering it in both CD and double LP formats. Although the press release announced an August 30, 2019 release date, the date was pushed back to September 13, 2019 outside of Canada. The band worked with engineer Tim Jessup, who also mixed the band’s Live at the Isle of Wight Festival. Robbie Gerson, reviewing the vinyl release for Audiophile Audition, gave an overall positive review, saying, "Rhino has done an outstanding job in re-mastering Chicago Transit Authority to 180-gram vinyl." In his review for All About Jazz, Doug Colette gave the CD four out of five stars, noting that there's "less precedence for the harmony singing," but that there's "wallop to the drums," "edge to the guitar," and "great care throughout to highlight, without overstatement but with proportionate accuracy and impact, the tightly-fused rhythm work of drummer Danny Seraphine and bassist Peter Cetera: both sound equally vigorous and muscular in their playing."

Awards and honors 

In 1969, the group was nominated for a Grammy Award for Best New Artist.

In 2014, Chicago Transit Authority was inducted into the Grammy Hall of Fame.

Chicago Transit Authority is the only Chicago album listed in 1001 Albums You Must Hear Before You Die.

Track listing

Personnel 
 Peter Cetera – bass, lead and backing vocals
 Terry Kath – guitars, lead and backing vocals
 Robert Lamm – keyboards, lead and backing vocals
 Lee Loughnane – trumpet, claves, backing vocals
 James Pankow – trombone, cowbell
 Walter Parazaider – saxophone, tambourine, backing vocals
 Danny Seraphine – drums, percussion

Production 
 James William Guercio – producer, original liner notes
 Fred Catero – engineer
 Nick Fasciano – artwork

2002 reissue
 Lee Loughnane – A&R, project supervisor
 David McLees – A&R, project supervisor
 Gary Peterson – A&R, project supervisor
 Mike Engstrom – project manager
 April Milek – project assistant
 Bob O'Neill – project assistant
 Ingrid K. Olson – project assistant
 Randy Perry – project assistant
 Steve Woolard – project assistant
 Jeff Magid – audio supervisor
 Cory Frye – editorial supervisor
 Steven Chean – editorial research
 David Donnelly – remastering
 Hugh Brown – photography
 Maria Villar – art direction, design
 David Wild – liner notes

Charts
Chicago Transit Authority (Columbia 8) reached No. 17 in the US during a chart stay of 171 weeks. It also peaked at No. 9 in the UK.

Weekly charts

Year-end charts

Singles

References

Chicago (band) albums
1969 debut albums
Grammy Hall of Fame Award recipients
Albums produced by James William Guercio
Columbia Records albums
Hard rock albums by American artists
Albums recorded at CBS 30th Street Studio